Lee Pearson (born 6 September 1976) is a former professional tennis player from Australia.

Biography
Pearson, who grew up in Victoria, played collegiate tennis at Auburn University in the United States.

In the early 2000s he competed on the professional circuit as a doubles specialist, winning four Challenger doubles titles. Most of his appearances on the ATP Tour were with Auburn teammate Stephen Huss, which included making the semi-finals of the 2001 Japan Open.

He made his grand slam main draw debut at the 2001 Australian Open, where he was a wildcard pairing with Matthew Breen. In 2002 he partnered with Stephen Huss to play in the main draw of both the Australian Open and US Open.

Challenger titles

Doubles: (4)

References

External links
 
 

1976 births
Living people
Australian male tennis players
Auburn Tigers men's tennis players
Place of birth missing (living people)
Tennis people from Victoria (Australia)